The cinnamon hummingbird (Amazilia rutila) is a species of hummingbird in the "emeralds", tribe Trochilini of subfamily Trochilinae. It is found from northwestern Mexico to Costa Rica.

Taxonomy
The cinnamon hummingbird was formally described in 1842 by the French naturalist René Lesson from a specimen he had collected near Acapulco in southwest Mexico. Lesson placed the new species in the genus Ornismya and coined the binomial name Ornismya cinnamomea. Unfortunate the epithet was preoccupied as Paul Gervais had in 1835 used Ornismya cinnamomeus for a different species of hummingbird. A year later, in 1843, the French ornithologist Adolphe Delattre  introduced Ornismya rutila as a replacement name for Lesson's hummingbird. The cinnamon hummingbird is now placed in the genus Amazilia that was introduced by Lesson in 1843. The genus name comes from the Inca heroine in Jean-François Marmontel's novel Les Incas, ou la destruction de l'Empire du Pérou. The specific epithet  is from Latin rutilus which means "golden", "red" or "aubun".

Four subspecies are recognised:
A. r. diluta Van Rossem, 1938
A. r. graysoni Lawrence, 1867
A. r. rutila (DeLattre, 1843)
A. r. corallirostris (Bourcier & Mulsant, 1846)

It has been suggested that graysoni be treated as a separate species and that diluta should be included in rutila because they intergrade.

Description
Adults of the nominate subspecies A. r. rutila have metallic bronze green upperparts and cinnamon to cinnamon rufous underparts that are paler on the chin and upper throat. The tail is deep cinnamon rufous to rufous chestnut; the feathers have dark metallic bronze tips and the outermost have dark metallic bronze outer edges. The wings are a dark brownish slate. Males' bills are red with a black tip and females' mostly black with red at the base. Juveniles are similar to adults but have rufous edges to the face, crown, and rump feathers and an all black bill.

The song is "varied, high, thin, slightly squeaky chips, si ch chi-chit or tsi si si-si-sit, or chi chi-chi chi chi, etc." Its call has been described as "a buzzy, scratchy tzip" and "a hard to sharp chik".

A. r. diluta is similar to the nominate, with slightly less intense green upperparts and paler and pinker underparts. A. r. corallirostris is also similar to the nominate but overall its colors are richer and deeper. A. r. graysoni is significantly larger and darker than the nominate but otherwise similar.

Distribution and habitat
The cinnamon hummingbird is resident throughout its range. The subspecies of cinnamon hummingbird are found thus:

A. r. diluta, the northwestern Mexican states of Sinaloa and Nayarit
A. r. graysoni, Isla María Madre in Islas Marías off the coast of western Mexico
A. r. rutila, from Jalisco in western Mexico south through El Salvador and western Honduras and Nicaragua into northwestern Costa Rica.
A. r. corallirostris, from Chiapas in Mexico south to El Salvador

The populations in Mexico's Yucatán state, northeastern Honduras, Nicaragua, and Costa Rica are usually attributed to A. r. rutila but have sometimes been considered to be part of A. r. corallirostris.

The cinnamon hummingbird inhabits primary and secondary deciduous and semi-deciduous forests and thorn forest.

Behavior

Feeding
The cinnamon hummingbird usually forages from the understory to the mid-story, but also will visit taller flowering trees. It feeds on nectar from a very wide variety of flowering plants and also eats insects. It is territorial and defends feeding sites from intrusion by other hummingbirds, bees, and butterflies.

Breeding
The cinnamon hummingbird's breeding season varies throughout its range; every month is represented somewhere. Its nest is a cup made of plant material and spider web placed on a horizontal branch. Three nests in western Mexico had a small platform of wood pieces under the cup. The cup was made of kapok seed fibers with grass, bits of wood, and lichens on the outside. All three were in semi-deciduous forest. The clutch size is two eggs, but little more is known about the species' breeding phenology.

Status
The IUCN has assessed the cinnamon hummingbird as being of Least Concern. It has a large range and its population is estimated to be at least 500,000 mature individuals and stable. Localized habitat destruction appears to be its only threat.

References

External links

cinnamon hummingbird
Hummingbird species of Central America
cinnamon hummingbird
Taxonomy articles created by Polbot